Persatuan Sepakbola Indonesia Kabupaten Sukabumi, simply known as Persikabumi Kabupaten Sukabumi or Persikabumi, is an Indonesian football club based in Sukabumi Regency, West Java. They currently compete in the Liga 3.

Rivalies
The club main rival is Perssi Sukabumi and the derby often called Derbi Sukabumi (Sukabumi Derby).

References

External links

Sukabumi Regency
Football clubs in Indonesia
Football clubs in West Java
Association football clubs established in 1919
1919 establishments in the Dutch East Indies